These are the films shown at the 10th New York Underground Film Festival, held from March 5–11, 2003.

See also
 New York Underground Film Festival site
 2003 Festival Archive

New York Underground Film Festival
N
Underground Film Festival
New York Underground Film
2003 in American cinema